Esther Feuer Panitch (born October 14, 1971) is an American politician serving as a member of the Georgia House of Representatives in the state of Georgia. Elected in November 2022 election, Panitsch took office in January 2023. She is the only Jewish member of the Georgia House of Representatives for the 157th Georgia General Assembly.

Political career
In February 2022, Panitch announced her campaign for the Georgia House of Representatives District 51 seat after Mike Wilensky, the only Jewish member of the Georgia General Assembly announced that he would not seek re-election. The District 51 seat was open after being vacated by Josh McLaurin, who was running for the Georgia State Senate.

After winning the Democratic primary, Panitch defeated Republican nominee Peter Korman in the November general election. Both Panitch and Korman are Jewish, ensuring that the 157th Georgia General Assembly would have at least one Jewish member.

In January 2023, Panitch invited Miriam Udel, a Yiddish professor at Emory University, to become the first female orthodox rabbi to give the opening prayer at the Georgia House of Representatives. After the Goyim Defense League distributed Antisemitic fliers in suburban Atlanta, including at Panitch's home, she sponsored a bill that would adopt IHRA definition of Antisemitism as Georgia law.

Personal life
Panitch was born in Miami, Florida and grew up in North Miami Beach. She earned her bachelor's degree from the University of Miami in 1992 and her Juris Doctor in 1995.

After law school, Panitch worked as an assistant public defender in Miami-Dade County from 1997 to 2002. She then opened her own law practice before moving to Atlanta, Georgia, in 2004. Before opening her own private law practice in Dunwoody in 2007, she worked at the Fulton County Conflict Defender's Office.

Panitch met her husband Roger in 1997 on a mission for the Jewish Federation. They have two sons and one daughter.

Electoral history

References

Living people
1971 births
Jewish women politicians